A clos (French 'enclosure') is a walled vineyard. Walled vineyards protected the grapes from theft and may improve the mesoclimate. They were often the vineyards of Cistercian monasteries. The word is often used in the name of famous wines even when the wall no longer exists.

By country

France
 Bordeaux: Château Léoville-Las Cases, Clos Haut-Peyraguey, Clos Fourtet, Clos des Jacobins, Clos de l'Oratoire, Clos de Plince, Clos Saint-Martin
 Burgundy: Clos Napoléon (Fixin), Chambertin-Clos de Bèze, Clos de Tart, Clos des Lambrays, Clos de la Roche, Clos Saint-Denis, La Romanée together with La Romanée-Conti, Clos de Vougeot, Clos des Réas (Vougeot), Corton-Clos du Roi, Clos des Ursules, Clos des Mouches (Beaune), Clos des Épeneaux (Pommard), Clos du Val (Auxey-Duresses), Clos des Chênes (Volnay), Montrachet
 Champagne: Clos des Goisses (Mareuil-sur-Aÿ), Clos du Mesnil (Le Mesnil-sur-Oger; see Champagne Krug), Clos Saint Hilaire (Mareuil-sur-Aÿ; see Billecart-Salmon)
 Alsace: Clos Sainte-Hune in Grand Cru Rosacker (Hunawihr), Clos Sainte-Odile (Obernai), Clos Saint-Urbain (Turkheim)
 Loire: Clos de la Coulée-de-Serrant, Clos du Papillon (Savennières), Le Grand Clos (Bourgueil)
 Rhône: Clos des Papes, Clos du Mont-Olivet, Clos de l'Oratoire des Papes (Châteauneuf-du-Pape)
 South West France: Clos La Coutale, Clos de Gamot, Clos Lapeyre, Clos Triguedina (Cahors)

Switzerland
 Vaud: Clos des Abbayes, Clos des Moines (Dézaley), Clos du Paradis (Aigle), Clos du Rocher, Clos des Rennauds (Yvorne)
 Valais: Clos Grand Brûlé, Clos des Montibeux (Leytron), Clos de Balavaud (Vétroz)

Germany
 Rheingau: Hattenheimer Pfaffenberg and Steinberg (Eberbach Abbey), Neroberg (Wiesbaden)
 Rheinhessen: Schlossmühle in Heidesheim, Niersteiner Glöck

Portugal
 Pico, Azores: Nearly all of the vineyards on the island of Pico are enclosed by stone walls, both for protection and as a way to re-use the large number of volcanic rocks that had to be shifted off the soil when vines were first planted.

United States
 Napa Valley: Clos Du Val, Clos Pegase

South Africa
 Stellenbosch: Clos Malverne

México 
 Valle de Guadalupe: Clos de Tres Cantos

References

Vineyards
Wine terminology